Gabrje pod Špilkom is a small settlement in the hills north of Blagovica in the Municipality of Lukovica in the eastern part of the Upper Carniola region of Slovenia.

Name
The name of the settlement was changed from Gabrje to Gabrje pod Špilkom in 1953.

References

External links 
 
Gabrje pod Špilkom on Geopedia

Populated places in the Municipality of Lukovica